Cyclostrongylus is a genus of parasitic nematodes. Species are oesophageal parasites of wallabies in Australia.

Cyclostrongylus alatus and Cyclostrongylus perplexus are parasites of Macropus rufogriseus, the red-necked wallaby.

References 

 Strongyle nematodes from Queensland marsupials. TH Johnston, PM Mawson - Transactions of the Royal Society of South Australia, 1939
 Some nematodes from Victorian and Western Australian marsupials. TH Johnston, PM Mawson - Transactions of the Royal Society of South Australia, 1939
 The genus Cyclostrongylus Johnston & Mawson (Nematoda Trichonematidae). P M Mawson, Transactions of The Royal Society of South Australia 1977 101, pages 19–20

External links 
 Cyclostrongylus at Atlas of Living Australia

Parasitic nematodes of mammals
Parasites of marsupials
Rhabditida genera